Virajpet Clock Tower is a clock tower in the town of Virajpet in Kodagu district, in the Indian State of Karnataka. The tower was built to commemorate the coronation of George V at the Delhi Durbar in 1911, and was inaugurated in 1915. To mark its centenary, a philatelic cover was released by Karnataka Postal Circle on 16 January 2015.

History
The piece of land for the construction of the clock tower was donated to the Virajpet Town Municipal Corporation by the Mukkatira family of Kodavas residing in a village Devanageri near Virajpet at the time. 

The foundation stone of the tower was laid by then Chief Commissioner of Coorg, Sir Hugh Daly on 5 February 1914. Following 11 months of construction work, it was inaugurated in January 1915, by then District Magistrate R. K. Ellis in January 1915.

References

Clock towers in India
Buildings and structures in Kodagu district